Sorbitan tristearate is a nonionic surfactant. It is variously used as a dispersing agent, emulsifier, and stabilizer, in food and in aerosol sprays.  As a food additive, it has the E number E492. Brand names for polysorbates include Alkest, Canarcel, and Span. The consistency of sorbitan tristearate is waxy; its color is light cream to tan.

See also 
 Sorbitan monostearate (Span 60)

References 

Food additives
Non-ionic surfactants
Stearate esters
E-number additives